Carnes Hill is a suburb of Sydney, in the state of New South Wales, Australia. Carnes Hill is located 38 kilometres southwest of the Sydney central business district, in the local government area of the City of Liverpool and is part of the Greater Western Sydney region.

The suburb and surrounding areas are rapidly expanding and are expected to reach a population of 100,000 in the future. In 2016 projects began for a recreational precinct which now include a library, cafes, a fitness centre, tennis courts, indoor basket courts, skate park, a large shopping mall with specialty stores and restaurants and a community centre on the corner of Cowpasture and Kurrajong Road. Carnes Hill has two AFL fields and is home to the South West Tigers.
The local primary school is Greenway Park Public School.

Population
In the 2016 Census, there were 2,043 people in Carnes Hill. 53.2% of people were born in Australia. The next most common countries of birth were Fiji 7.0% and Iraq 6.2%. 38.5% of people spoke only English at home. Other languages spoken at home included Hindi 8.0% and Arabic 6.6%. The most common responses for religion were Catholic 36.9%, Islam 12.3%, No Religion 8.9% and Hinduism 0.1%.

References

Suburbs of Sydney
City of Liverpool (New South Wales)